Cacochroa corfuella is a moth of the family Depressariidae. It is found in Greece (it was described from Corfu).

References

Cryptolechiinae
Moths described in 2000
Moths of Europe